Cueva del Hierro is a municipality located in the Province of Cuenca, Castile-La Mancha, Spain. It has a population of 35.

References 

Municipalities in the Province of Cuenca